is a 2007 short film written and directed by Craig Shimahara.

Plot
Jinbei Masuda, a Japanese Christian of the samurai class, draws his strength from his faith, family, and fencing. However, he is caught up in the shogun's policy of religious persecution and must choose between his loved ones and his God.

Ships from Europe brought Christianity to the shores of Japan in 1549. For decades the seeds of faith grew under the watchful gaze of the Shogun. But the fear of foreign influence eventually gave rise to persecution. By 1624, Japanese Christians enjoyed only a few more years of peace.

Cast
Shin Koyamada – Jinbei Masuda 益田甚平
Yoshi Ando – Michijiro
Atsushi Hirata – Iwanaga
Yutaka Takeuchi – Tsunoyasu
Craig Reid – Catholic Priest
Kazumi Zatkin – Otsu
Maxwell Banchi – Shiro
Christine Shimahara – Kinu
Tex Nakamura – Daimyo
Yuji Tone – Attendant
Mitsuji Higashimoto – Guard No. 1
Agata Toshiya – Guard No. 2

See also
 Amakusa Shirō
 Shimabara Rebellion
 Shimabara Peninsula

External links
 
 Shin Koyamada's movie promotion with the Governor of Miyazaki Prefecture in Japan

2007 films
Films about Japanese Americans
2000s Japanese-language films
Samurai films
2000s Japanese films